"Loaded" is a song by Scottish rock band Primal Scream, released on 19 February 1990 as the lead single from their third studio album Screamadelica (1991). Mixed and produced by Andrew Weatherall, it is a remix of an earlier song titled "I'm Losing More Than I'll Ever Have".

In 2014, NME placed the song at number 59 in its list of the 500 Greatest Songs of All Time.

Inspiration and composition
Primal Scream first became aware of Andrew Weatherall after he published a favourable review of their eponymous second album in the Boys Own fanzine. Having subsequently met him at an acid house party at which he was DJing and become friends through various later meetings, it was suggested that he should remix "I'm Losing More Than I'll Ever Have" from the album, work for which he was to receive a fee of £500.

Weatherall's first attempt, which he later described as basically just having "slung a kick drum under the original", was judged by the band to have been too reverential to the source material and was rejected. Guitarist Andrew Innes instructed Weatherall to instead "just fucking destroy it". His subsequent attempt abandoned all of the original track with the exception of a seven-second sample.

At the start of the song, Weatherall added an audio sample of Frank Maxwell and Peter Fonda from the film The Wild Angels.

The rest of the song is constructed from the parts of "I'm Losing More Than I'll Ever Have", with a vocal sample from The Emotions' "I Don't Wanna Lose Your Love", and a drum loop from an Italian bootleg remix of Edie Brickell's song "What I Am", plus Bobby Gillespie singing a line from Robert Johnson's "Terraplane Blues".

Single release
The single was released in February 1990, 18 months before the arrival of Screamadelica in October 1991. It was around 3 minutes shorter than the album version.

"Loaded" reached number 16 on the UK Singles Chart, making it the group's first UK top 40 hit and garnering them a first appearance on television chart show Top of the Pops. The single featured a remix from regular Weatherall collaborator Terry Farley whose version reincorporated part of the original vocal from "I'm Losing More Than I'll Ever Have". The 7" b-side was a Pat Collier remix of the source track, "I'm Losing More Than I'll Ever Have".

Muzik magazine listed the song as one of the 50 most influential dance records of all time, describing it as "unquestionably the finest indie dance record ever ... something akin to "Sympathy for the Devil" for the E generation". (In the Netherlands, a novelty-type mash-up of "Loaded" and "Sympathy for the Devil", made and performed by two radio DJs, became a minor hit).

Legacy
In 2022, it was included in the list "The story of NME in 70 (mostly) seminal songs": Mark Beaumont wrote that with this "majestic" song, "worlds of indie and dance most gloriously collided".

Charts

Certifications

In film
The song is played at the beginning of the movie The World's End and was included in its soundtrack.

References

1990 singles
1990 songs
Creation Records singles
Primal Scream songs
Song recordings produced by Andrew Weatherall
Songs written by Bobby Gillespie
Songs written by Andrew Innes
Acid house songs
Dance-rock songs
Songs written by Robert Young (musician)